Grandwizard Theodore & the Fantastic Five (also known as the Fantastic Freaks or simply Fantastic Five) was an old school hip hop group, best known for their 12" single, "Can I Get A Soul Clap" (1980) The group also appeared in the film Wild Style (1982) and recorded a song in 1994 with the Cold Crush Brothers and Terminator X which appeared on Terminator X's album, Super Bad. In 1998, they released Harlem World 1981, a recording of an MC battle between the Fantastic Five and Cold Crush Brothers, which had taken place in 1981.

References

Hip hop groups from New York City